The 2003 Prince Edward Island general election was held on September 29, 2003 to elect the 27 members of the Legislative Assembly of Prince Edward Island. The election was called on September 2 by Premier Pat Binns, who enjoyed a high level of popularity among voters.

Polling took place on September 29, despite a blackout across two-thirds of the province and other damage caused by Hurricane Juan.

Binns' Progressive Conservatives were elected to a third consecutive majority government, the first time this had happened in Island history (for the PC party). The Premier, who ran in Murray River-Gaspereaux, was re-elected, along with his entire existing cabinet.

The Liberals wrested three seats from the Tories, increasing their standing to four seats. The party's new leader, Robert Ghiz, was one of those. The son of former premier Joe Ghiz beat Charlottetown mayor George MacDonald in the riding of Charlottetown-Rochford Square in Charlottetown.

The New Democrats did not win any seats; their leader, Gary Robichaud, was defeated by a Tory incumbent in Wilmot-Summerside.

Results

Largest and smallest margins of victory

The five largest margins of victory were:
 Kensington-Malpeque: Mitch Murphy, PC, defeated Janice Sherry, Liberal, by 1416 votes.
 North River-Rice Point: Ron MacKinley, Liberal, defeated Donna Butler, PC, by 1103 votes.
 Murray River-Gaspereaux: Pat Binns, PC, defeated Michelle Johnston, Liberal, by 959 votes.
 Glen Stewart-Bellevue Cove: David McKenna, PC, defeated Eric Ellsworth, Liberal, by 958 votes.
 Alberton-Miminegash: Cletus Dunn, PC, defeated Robert B. White, Liberal, by 737 votes.

The five smallest margins of victory were:
 Sherwood-Hillsborough: Elmer MacFadyen, PC, defeated Robert Mitchell, Liberal, by 61 votes.
 Borden-Kinkora:  Fred McCardle, PC, defeated Lorne Sutherland, Liberal, by 71 votes.
 St. Eleanors-Summerside: Helen MacDonald, PC, defeated Gerard Greenan, Liberal, by 93 votes.
 Evangeline-Miscouche: Wilfred Arsenault, PC, defeated Sonny Gallant, Liberal, by 104 votes.
 Charlottetown-Kings Square: Richard Brown, Liberal, defeated Bob MacMillan, PC, by 142 votes.

Riding-by-riding results

Prince County

|-
|bgcolor="whitesmoke"|Alberton-Miminegash
|| 
|Cletus Dunn1697
|
|Robert B. White960
|
|Donna Hardy53
|
| 
|| 
|Cletus J. Dunn
|-
|bgcolor="whitesmoke"|Borden-Kinkora
|| 
|Fred McCardle1528
|
|Lorne Sutherland1457
|
|James Rodd80
|
| 
|| 
|Eric Hammill†
|-
|bgcolor="whitesmoke"|Cascumpec-Grand River
|| 
|Philip Brown1477
|
|Robert Noye981
|
|Peter Robinson178
|
| 
|| 
|Philip Brown
|-
|bgcolor="whitesmoke"|Evangeline-Miscouche
|| 
|Wilfred Arsenault1312
|
|Sonny Gallant1208
|
|Leona Arsenault 69
|
| 
|| 
|Wilfred Arsenault

|-
|bgcolor="whitesmoke"|Kensington-Malpeque
|| 
|Mitch Murphy 2536
|
|Janice Sherry1120
|
|George S. Hunter 92
|
| 
|| 
|Mitch Murphy 
|-
|bgcolor="whitesmoke"|St. Eleanors-Summerside
|| 
|Helen MacDonald1590
|
|Gerard Greenan1497
|
|Paulette Halupa97
|
| 
|| 
|Helen MacDonald
|-
|bgcolor="whitesmoke"|Tignish-Deblois
|| 
|Gail Shea1480
|
|Neil LeClair1177
|
|Reg Pendergast20
|
| 
|| 
|Gail Shea

|-
|bgcolor="whitesmoke"|West Point-Bloomfield
|| 
|Eva Rodgerson1193
|
|Sean O'Halloran872
|
|Ed Kilfoil232
|
| 
|| 
|Eva Rodgerson
|-
|bgcolor="whitesmoke"|Wilmot-Summerside
|| 
|Greg Deighan1807
|
|Duke Cormier1402
|
|Gary Robichaud257
|
| 
|| 
|Greg Deighan
|}

Queens County

|-
|bgcolor="whitesmoke"|Belfast-Pownal Bay
|| 
|Wilbur MacDonald 1331
|
|Sarah Jane Bell1091
|
|Michael Page110
|
| 
|| 
|Wilbur MacDonald

|-
|bgcolor="whitesmoke"|Crapaud-Hazel Grove
|
|Norman MacPhee1683
|| 
|Carolyn Bertram1829
|
|Miranda Ellis 99
|
| 
|| 
|Norman MacPhee
|-
|bgcolor="whitesmoke"|Glen Stewart-Bellevue Cove
|| 
|David McKenna2249
|
|Eric Ellsworth1291
|
|Jane MacNeil 243
|
| 
|| 
|Pat Mella
|-
|bgcolor="whitesmoke"|North River-Rice Point
|
|Donna Butler1403
|| 
|Ron MacKinley2506
|
|Marlene Hunt 108
|
| 
|| 
|Ron MacKinley

|-
|bgcolor="whitesmoke"|Park Corner-Oyster Bed
|| 
|Beth MacKenzie1908
|
|Jean Tingley1608
|
|Ken Bingham184
|
|
|| 
|Beth MacKenzie

|-
|bgcolor="whitesmoke"|Stanhope-East Royalty
|| 
|Jamie Ballem1858
|
|Robert Vessey1400
|
|Gerard Gallant78
|
| 
|| 
|Jamie Ballem 
|-
|bgcolor="whitesmoke"|Tracadie-Fort Augustus
|| 
|Mildred Dover1628
|
|Buck Watts1253
|
|Robert Perry64
|
| 
|| 
|Mildred Dover
|-
|bgcolor="whitesmoke"|Winsloe-West Royalty
|| 
|Wayne Collins1971
|
|Gordon MacKay1816
|
|
|
| 
|| 
|Don MacKinnon†
|}

Charlottetown

|-
|bgcolor="whitesmoke"|Charlottetown-Kings Square
|
|Bob MacMillan1278
|| 
|Richard Brown1420
|
|Kevin Roach86
|
|
|| 
|Bob MacMillan
|-
|bgcolor="whitesmoke"|Charlottetown-Rochford Square
|
|George MacDonald1276
|| 
|Robert Ghiz1433
|
|J'Nan Brown120
|
|
|| 
|Jeff Lantz †
|-
|bgcolor="whitesmoke"|Charlottetown-Spring Park
|| 
|Wes MacAleer1649
|
|Barry Ling 1448
|
|Teresa Peters99
|
| 
|| 
|Wes MacAleer

|-
|bgcolor="whitesmoke"|Parkdale-Belvedere
|| 
|Chester Gillan 1562
|
|Charlie Cooke897
|
|Nick Boragina 78
|
| 
|| 
|Chester Gillan
|-
|bgcolor="whitesmoke"|Sherwood-Hillsborough
|| 
|Elmer MacFadyen1408
|
|Robert Mitchell1347
|
|Ronald G. Kelly 75
|
| 
|| 
|Elmer MacFadyen
|}

Kings County

|-
|bgcolor="whitesmoke"|Georgetown-Baldwin's Road
|| 
|Mike Currie1652
|
|Danny Walker984
|
|Jane Dunphy64
|
|
|| 
|Mike Currie
|-
|bgcolor="whitesmoke"|Montague-Kilmuir
|| 
|Jim Bagnall1431
|
|John Van Dyke 792
|
|Lorne Cudmore 30
|
| 
|| 
|Jim Bagnall
|-
|bgcolor="whitesmoke"|Morell-Fortune Bay
|| 
|Kevin MacAdam1601
|
|Larry McGuire1050
|
|
|
|
|| 
|Kevin J. MacAdam
|-
|bgcolor="whitesmoke"|Murray River-Gaspereaux
|| 
|Pat Binns1584
|
|Michelle Johnston 625
|
|Edith Perry 45
|
| 
|| 
|Pat Binns
|-
|bgcolor="whitesmoke"|Souris-Elmira
|| 
|Andy Mooney1291
|
|Philip MacDonald1047
|
|
|
| 
|| 
|Andy Mooney
|}

See also
List of PEI political parties

References

Further reading

External links
Government of Prince Edward Island
Elections PEI
CBC - PEI Votes 2003

Parties
Progressive Conservative Party of PEI (see also Progressive Conservative Party of Canada)
Liberal Party of PEI (see also Liberal Party of Canada)
Island New Democrats (see also New Democratic Party)

Prince Edward Island general
Elections in Prince Edward Island
2003 in Prince Edward Island
September 2003 events in Canada